Wulguru, or Manbara, also spelt Manbarra, is an Australian Aboriginal language, now extinct, that was spoken by the Wulgurukaba (or Manbarra) people around the area around present day Townsville, Queensland, on the east coast of Australia.  The range of Wulguru dialects known to have been around the area include two varieties mentioned from Palm Island, two from the Cleveland Bay area, and various dialects from Townsville.

Classification
Wulguru seems to be a Pama–Nyungan language that was typical for the sort found on the eastern Australian coast.  Wulguru ceased to be spoken before it was properly documented, and as a result much of what linguists know of the language is fragmentary.

Possible dialect names include  Mulgu, Buluguyban, Wulgurukaba, Coonambella, Nhawalgaba.

Phonology

Wulguru has three vowels; /i/, /u/, and /a/. Length distinctions exist for all vowels.

Notes

References

Dyirbalic languages
Extinct languages of Queensland